Mosiah Bikila Gilligan (born 19 February 1988) is a British stand-up comedian. He is known for his observational comedy. After several years of uploading comedy clips to social media, he found global success in 2017. He hosted The Lateish Show with Mo Gilligan (2019) on Channel 4. He currently co-hosts The Big Narstie Show on Channel 4, and is a judge on The Masked Singer UK since the second series in 2020, and a judge on The Masked Dancer UK since 2021. In 2022 Gilligan took a break from The Masked Dancer UK due to work issues, and was replaced by Peter Crouch.

Early life
Mosiah Bikila Gilligan was born on 19 February 1988 in Lambeth, London to British parents of Jamaican and St. Lucian descent. His mother was born in Wales while his father is from Brixton. His parents separated when he was 5, and he was raised by both parents while living in Camberwell, London. He began his interest in comedy whilst attending a performing arts school in Pimlico. Gilligan is an avid supporter of Arsenal F.C.

Career
Gilligan was working in retail, when he began uploading comedy videos on his social media accounts. His videos were popular and customers eventually began recognising him. His breakout moment came in 2017, when he was spotted by Canadian rapper Drake, who quoted some of Gilligan's comedy on his own Instagram account. His influences include Dave Chappelle and Chris Rock; he did his first lengthy show after watching a Chris Rock stand-up film.

Gilligan currently co-hosts The Big Narstie Show, which debuted 29 June 2018 on Channel 4, with rapper Big Narstie. Between them, they have been cited as some of the original purveyors of grime comedy. He paired up with Claudia Winkleman to compete on the 2018 edition of The Big Fat Quiz of the Year also on Channel 4, which they won.

Gilligan hosts his own show, The Lateish Show with Mo Gilligan, which debuted 19 July 2019 on Channel 4. Later on in the year, his first comedy special on Netflix, Mo Gilligan: Momentum, was released globally in 190 countries.

Since June 2020, Gilligan has appeared on the second and third series of Celebrity Gogglebox, as well as the Stand Up to Cancer special of Gogglebox alongside comedian Babatunde Aleshe.

On 19 August 2020, ITV announced Gilligan would become a panellist on the second series of The Masked Singer UK, replacing Ken Jeong.

In 2020, Gilligan produced the hour long documentary Black, British, and Funny for Black History Month. He examined the history of the Black comedy circuit, featuring pioneering stars like Angie Le Mar, Richard Blackwood, Danny 'Slim' Gray and Rudi Lickwood, and newer comedians including Kayode Ewumi and Michael Dapaah.

In October 2020, Gilligan appeared as a contestant on The Cube alongside actor David Ajao.

On 4 March 2021, ITV announced Gilligan would become a panellist on the spin-off of The Masked Singer UK, The Masked Dancer UK.

On 8 February 2022 and 11 February 2023, Gilligan hosted the BRIT Awards from the O2 Arena.

In October 2022, Channel 4 broadcast Mo Gilligan + Friends: The Black British Takeover, a standup special featuring Gilligan plus Eddie Kadi, Ola Labib, Slim, Thanyia Moore, Babatunde Aléshé and The Compozers, recorded at the O2 in December 2021.

On 29 November 2022, Gilligan was confirmed as the host of the upcoming BBC One series called That's My Jam.

See also
List of British comedians
Munya Chawawa
Michael Dapaah

References

External links

1988 births
Living people
21st-century English comedians
Best Entertainment Performance BAFTA Award (television) winners
Black British male comedians
Comedians from London
English people of Jamaican descent
English people of Welsh descent
English people of Saint Lucian descent
English television talk show hosts
People from Camberwell
People from Lambeth